The turkey moray (Gymnothorax meleagris),also known as the guineafowl moray or as the white-mouth/whitemouth moray is a species of marine fish in the family Muraenidae.

Description
The turkey moray is a medium size moray which can reach a maximum length of 120 cm, but specimens usually encountered are much smaller.
Its serpentine in shape body has a dark brown to black background color dotted with numerous small white spots uniformly distributed.
The inside of its mouth is completely white.

Distribution and habitat
The white-mouth moray is widespread throughout the Indo-Pacific area from eastern coast of Africa, Red Sea included, until Polynesia and Hawaii and from south Japan to New Caledonia.
This is a relatively rare moray even within its distribution area except in Hawaii, where it seems to be common.

They sense prey by detecting smell through the water.

Biology
The turkey moray seems to be equally active day and night and feeds on small fish and occasionally crustaceans.

References

External links

http://www.marinespecies.org/aphia.php?p=taxdetails&id=217503
http://eol.org/pages/204334/details
http://doris.ffessm.fr/fiche2.asp?fiche_numero=1565
http://www.itis.gov/servlet/SingleRpt/SingleRpt?search_topic=TSN&search_value=161210
 
 

meleagris
Fish of Hawaii
Fish described in 1795